The deep temporal nerves are two branches of the anterior division of the mandibular nerve that innervate the temporalis.

Structure
The deep temporal nerves are usually two in number and termed the anterior deep temporal nerve and posterior deep temporal nerve. They branch from the anterior division of the mandibular nerve and travel above the upper border of the lateral pterygoid muscle. They ascend to enter the temporal fossa and enter the deep surface of the temporalis.

Nerve pathway 

 trigeminal nerve (CN V)
 mandibular nerve (V3)
 anterior division of mandibular nerve
 deep temporal nerves (anterior and posterior)

Function 
The deep temporal nerves provide motor innervation to the temporalis, which is a muscle of mastication that elevates and retracts the mandible. The deep temporal nerves also have articular branches which provide a minor contribution to the innervation of the temporomandibular joint.

Variation 
Sometimes, three deep temporal nerves are present branching from the anterior division of the mandibular nerve. In this case the extra nerve is situated between the anterior and posterior and called the middle deep temporal nerve.

The anterior deep temporal nerve is sometimes a branch of the buccal nerve.

The posterior deep temporal nerve is sometimes a branch of the masseteric nerve.

References

Mandibular nerve